Louis Cardiet (20 January 1943 – 28 April 2020) was a French professional footballer who played as a defender.

After football 
After his football career, Cardiet became a trader in the fish trade of his hometown Quimperlé.

Honours 
Rennes

 Coupe de France: 1964–65, 1970–71
 Challenge des Champions: 1971

Notes

References

External links
Profile on FFF website
Profile on the Planète PSG web site

1943 births
2020 deaths
French footballers
People from Quimperlé
Sportspeople from Finistère
Footballers from Brittany
Association football defenders
FC Lorient players
Stade Rennais F.C. players
Paris Saint-Germain F.C. players
Ligue 1 players
Ligue 2 players
French Division 3 (1971–1993) players
France international footballers